Ealing Common is a large open space (approx ) in Ealing, West London.

Boundaries

The Ealing Common Area is bounded by Ealing Town Centre to the west, North Ealing and Hanger Hill to the north, Acton to the east and South Ealing and South Acton to the south.

The Ealing Common open space is bounded by Gunnersbury Ave (A406) to the east and the Uxbridge Road to the north. A smaller area of the common extends to the east of Gunnersbury Ave, including Leopold Road. The western boundary includes The Common and Warwick Dene, with Elm Avenue to the south. Some distance to the south is also the much larger Gunnersbury Park.

Ownership
The Ealing Common open space is a common land as designated by the 1866 Metropolitan Commons Act.

History
In August 1733 a cricket match was played on the common between Ealing & Acton and London Cricket Club.

Flora
Ealing Common preserves a large area of open space with fine avenues of horse chestnut trees, most of which were planted in the late Victorian period, following the purchase of the common land by the Ealing Local Board. The northern part of the common has a large English oak tree at its centre, and London plane trees are also found with the horse chestnuts around the perimeter of the common. Charles Jones was the borough surveyor responsible for the layout.

In the south-west corner of Ealing Common there is a small enclosed park, called Warwick Dene, with rose beds at its centre.

Other information
There is a local Conservation Area which includes streets around the common.

Ealing Common is also informally used by some as the name of the area in the London Borough of Ealing surrounding Ealing Common station, which is named after the common; however, it is officially part of the Ealing district.

References

External links
Ealing Common Conservation area Appraisal on Ealing Council Website.

1733 establishments in England
Common land in London
Cricket grounds in Middlesex
Cricket in Middlesex
Defunct cricket grounds in England
Defunct sports venues in London
Districts of the London Borough of Ealing
English cricket venues in the 18th century
History of Middlesex
Middlesex
Parks and open spaces in the London Borough of Ealing
Sport in London
Sports venues completed in 1733
Sports venues in London